Isaac Mitchell may refer to:
 Isaac Mitchell (writer) (1759–1812), American author and journalist
 Isaac Mitchell (trade unionist) (1867–1952[), Scottish trade unionist. 
 Isaac Mitchell (New York politician, born 1835) (1835–1893), American farmer and politician from New York
 Isaac B. Mitchell (1888–1977), American farmer and politician from New York.